Banana pith or banana stem, is a vegetable harvested from the starchy inner core of banana pseudostems. It is used similarly to heart of palms in the cuisines of the Philippines, Malaysia, Indochina, Sri Lanka, and southern India.

See also 
Banana flower
Banana leaves
Palmyra sprout
Deckenia nobilis
Sago

References 

Stem vegetables
Philippine cuisine
Indian cuisine
Malaysian cuisine
Burmese cuisine
Sri Lankan cuisine